Moshe Dovid Winternitz (1855–1944) was the Head of the Beth din Rabbinical Court in Satmar, Hungary (now Satu Mare, Romania). This position was second to the Rabbi of the city. He is considered to be one of the greatest scholars of his time. People from around the globe would send him Halachic queries.

In the summer of 1944, he was deported with many of the other Jews of Satmar to the Auschwitz Death camp, where he perished.

References

1855 births
1944 deaths
People from Satu Mare
Romanian Jews
Austro-Hungarian Jews
Haredi rabbis in Europe
Hungarian Orthodox rabbis
Hungarian civilians killed in World War II
Hungarian people who died in Auschwitz concentration camp
Hungarian Jews who died in the Holocaust